Basic Education High School No. 1 Kyaukse is a public high school located in Kyaukse, Mandalay Region, Myanmar. The school offers classes from kindergarten to Tenth Standard.

High schools in Mandalay Region